{{Speciesbox
|image = 
|image_caption = 
| genus = Pseudocayratia
| species = oligocarpa
| authority = (H.Lév. & Vaniot) J.Wen & L.M.Lu
| display_parents = 3
| synonyms = * Cayratia oligocarpa (Lév. & Vaniot) Gagnep.<ref>Gagnepain F (1911) In: Lecomte: Not. Syst. 1: 348</ref>
 Vitis oligocarpa Lév. & Vaniot (basionym)
 Columella oligocarpa (Lév. & Vaniot) Rehder
 Cissus aligocarpa (Lév. & Vaniot) L. H. Bailey
}}Pseudocayratia oligocarpa is a species of Asian vine plants in the subfamily Vitoideae.  This species, found from central-southern China to Vietnam, was previously placed in the non-monophyletic genus Cayratia'', but these genera are not dissimilar and are now placed in the tribe Cayratieae.

References

External links
 
 

 Flora of Indo-China 
Vitaceae